Aaron Christopher Billy Ondélé Appindangoyé (born 20 February 1992) is a Gabonese professional footballer who plays as a central defender for Turkish club Sivasspor.

International career

International goals
Scores and results list Gabon's goal tally first.

Honours
Sivasspor
 Turkish Cup: 2021–22

References

External links

1992 births
Living people
Gabonese footballers
Gabon international footballers
Association football defenders
Primeira Liga players
Ligue 2 players
Süper Lig players
Boavista F.C. players
Thonon Evian Grand Genève F.C. players
Stade Lavallois players
Ümraniyespor footballers
Sivasspor footballers
2015 Africa Cup of Nations players
2017 Africa Cup of Nations players
Gabonese expatriate footballers
Expatriate footballers in Portugal
Expatriate footballers in France
People from Haut-Ogooué Province
21st-century Gabonese people
Gabon A' international footballers
Gabonese expatriate sportspeople in France
Gabonese expatriate sportspeople in Turkey
Gabonese expatriate sportspeople in Portugal
2014 African Nations Championship players